Chiunzi is a mountain pass in Campania, Italy. It connects the Agro Nocerino Sarnese with the Amalfi coast through the municipalities of Sant'Egidio del Monte Albino and Tramonti. It is situated between the municipalities of Tramonti and Corbara, in the Province of Salerno.

Mountains of Campania
Amalfi Coast